The 2005–06 season was the third season in the history of the Llanelli Scarlets rugby union team. They competed in the Celtic League, in which they finished in sixth place, as well as the Anglo-Welsh Cup and Heineken Cup. They reached the final of the Anglo-Welsh Cup, losing 26–10 to London Wasps at Twickenham Stadium in London. They were also drawn against Wasps in their Heineken Cup pool, as well as Toulouse for a second year in a row, but again managed just two wins to finish third, above only Edinburgh Gunners.

Celtic League

Matches

Table

Anglo-Welsh Cup

Pool stage

Knockout stage

Heineken Cup

Pool stage

Notes

References

2005-06
Scarlets
Scarlets
Scarlets